Sundadanio margarition is a danionin in the family Cyprinidae. It is endemic to Sarawak, Malaysian Borneo, and known from the Rajang and Sarawak River drainages. It lives in coastal peat swamp forests.

Sundadanio margarition reaches a maximum size of  standard length.

References

Sundadanio
Endemic fauna of Borneo
Freshwater fish of East Malaysia
Taxa named by Kevin W. Conway
Taxa named by Maurice Kottelat
Taxa named by Heok Hui Tan
Fish described in 2011